The International Liquid Mirror Telescope (ILMT) is a  liquid-mirror telescope located at the Devasthal Observatory in Uttarakhand, India.

History
The International Liquid Mirror Telescope succeeds the NASA-LMT and the Large Zenith Telescope. It was conceived in the late 1990s, led by Jean Surdej of the University of Liège, Belgium (a collaboration between astronomical institutions in Belgium, Canada, India and Poland). First light was hoped for by 2009. In 2012, the mercury vessel was delivered, but construction was delayed, and then they didn’t have (50 litres = 700kgs) enough mercury. On 22 April 2013, dome construction was reported. It is near 3.6m Devasthal Optical Telescope, Aryabhatta Research Institute of Observational Sciences. First light was reported in June 2022, the commissioning phase started, and scientific observations may occur in October 2022.

"The ILMT collaboration includes researchers at the Aryabhatta Research Institute of observational sciencES (ARIES, an autonomous institute under the Department of Science and Technology (DST), Govt. of India) and the Indian Space Research Organization (ISRO) in India, the University of Liège and the Royal Observatory of Belgium in Belgium, Poznan Observatory in Poland, the Ulugh Beg Astronomical Institute of the Uzbek Academy of Sciences and National University of Uzbekistan, the University of British Columbia, Laval University, the University of Montreal, the University of Toronto, York University and the University of Victoria in Canada.

The telescope was designed and built by the AMOS corporation and the Centre Spatial de Liège in Belgium."

The ultimate goal is to take a Liquid Mirror Telescope off-Earth.

References

External links 
 4m International Liquid Mirror Telescope - University of Liège
 Belgo-Indian Network for Astronomy and Astrophysics - Royal Observatory of Belgium
 
 

Telescopes
Optical telescopes
Astronomical observatories in India
Liquid mirror telescopes